Joseph Kirtley Carson Jr.  (December 19, 1891 – December 20, 1956) was a mayor of Portland, Oregon from 1933 to 1941 as well as an attorney and unsuccessful candidate for governor.

Early life
Joseph Kirtley Carson Jr. was born on December 19, 1891, in the village of McKinney, Kentucky, the son of Joseph Kelly Carson and Sallie Elizabeth Adeline (Johnson).  His family moved several times before arriving in  Hood River, Oregon in 1903.  Joseph graduated from high school in Hood River, and then moved to Portland in 1914.

He graduated from the University of Oregon School of Law on May 4, 1917.  On the same day he was admitted to the Oregon State Bar he also joined the 12th Company of the Oregon regiment of coast artillery.  He served as a private at Fort Stevens at the mouth of the Columbia River.  He made sergeant in August 1917.  He served at Fort Stevens and Fort Canby until February 1918.  His next service was at Fort Monroe in Virginia.  In April 1918 he traveled to Florida to serve as an instructor at Camp Joseph E. Johnston where he was promoted to second lieutenant.  In World War I he was sent on the U.S.S. Kroonland to France where he landed in October 1918.  He served with the 301st railhead detachment, and was discharged in October 1919 with the rank of first lieutenant.

Early political career
In 1922, Carson was elected a Democratic precinct committeeman.  He was an unsuccessful candidate for the Oregon state legislature in 1922, 1924, and 1926. In 1928 he was a candidate to represent a congressional district at the Democratic National Convention.  Arriving back in Oregon he began a correspondence with Franklin Delano Roosevelt that would last four years.

Mayor of Portland
When George Luis Baker chose not to try for re-election as mayor, Joseph decided to run.  He was elected November 8, 1932, to take office July 1, 1933. One of his first acts was to appoint his former coastal artillery colonel Berton K. Lawson as police chief of Portland.

Carson was mayor of Portland during the depression.  He became a vocal critic of the Works Progress Administration.  A conservative Democrat who believed in rugged individualism, he stopped several New Deal initiatives.  Government deficit spending was anathema to him.  He set the tone at a Rotary Club meeting in 1932: "We must quit asking the government to be a nurse to everything.  We must realize that the people support the government, not that the government supports the people".

A waterfront strike of longshoremen in 1934 was considered by Carson to be the most unpleasant event of his mayoral administration.

Post mayoral career
Carson did not seek re-election in 1940 but instead returned to private law practice. He served in World War II, retiring as a full colonel in 1945.

He was appointed by President Harry S. Truman to the United States Maritime Commission in 1947 until the commission was abolished and replaced in 1950.  He then became the vice president of the Propeller Club of the United States, headquartered in New York.  He returned to his law practice in Portland in 1953 and in the 1954 Oregon gubernatorial election, he was the Democratic nominee for governor but lost to Paul L. Patterson in the general election.

Personal
Carson married his first wife, Hazel Irene Jenkins of Pendleton, Oregon on March 26, 1926.  She died of tuberculosis on May 4, 1928.  He became the first and thus far the only mayor of Portland to be married while in office when he married Myrtle Cradick of Portland in the White Temple on June 19, 1937.  They had one daughter, Mrs. Richard (Joan) Staley, and one son, Lucian Joseph (August 10, 1939 – January 19, 1990).  His wife Myrtle died on February 25, 1982.

He served as the president (Commander?) of the state American Legion in 1941.  He also belonged to the Last Man Club, the Hood River Lodge, Ancient, Free and Accepted Masons, York Rite bodies of Masonry, the University Club of Portland, the Arlington Club, Columbia Edgewater Country Club, Woodmen of the World, Delta Theta Phi, and the state and Multnomah County bar association.

As a young man, he enjoyed playing baseball.  He was appointed the first Oregon state chairman of junior baseball for the American Legion.  He had a great interest in biography (his favorite work was The Life of John Marshall by Albert J. Beveridge), and portraits of the presidents were hung in his law offices.

Carson died of a coronary thrombosis suffered at his home on the morning of December 20, 1956.

References

Barker, Neil "Portland's Works Progress Administration" Oregon Historical Quarterly vol. 101 Winter 2000, pp. 430–432, 436, 438.
"Death Calls Ex-Mayor" Oregonian, December 21, 1956 p. 1.
Hazen, David W. "Carson Earns First Money at Age of 8 Driving Hogs in Native State, Kentucky" Oregonian, May 23, 1933 p. 3.
Hazen, David W. "Carson in Book Agent Days Has Doors Closed in His Face" Oregonian, May 25, 1933, p. 7.
Hazen, David W. "Carson, Native of Kentucky, Glad He Came to Oregon" Oregonian May 27, 1933, p. 7.
Hazen, David W. "Carson Remembers Snakes and Frogs of Kentucky" Oregonian May 22, 1933, p. 14.
Hazen, David W. "Lawyer Joe Carson Admitted to Bar and Army Same Day Just 14 Years Ago" Oregonian, May 26, 1933, p. 4.
"Target of Labor in Longshore Strike, Carson Earned Group's Indorsement" Oregonian December 21, 1956, p. 19.

1891 births
1956 deaths
Mayors of Portland, Oregon
Oregon Democrats
Oregon lawyers
University of Oregon School of Law alumni
People from Hood River, Oregon
People from Lincoln County, Kentucky
Deaths from coronary thrombosis
20th-century American politicians
20th-century American lawyers